Marcelino Quiñonez is an American politician, playwright, and activist serving as a member of the Arizona House of Representatives from the 11th district. He assumed office on December 16, 2021 after being appointed to replace Diego Rodriguez.

Early life and education 
Quiñonez was born in Durango, Mexico and raised in San Jose, California. After graduating from South Mountain High School, he earned a Bachelor of Arts degree and Master of Fine Arts in theatre from Arizona State University During his education, he studied under Marshall W. Mason.

Career 
Quiñonez has worked as a drama teacher at the Arizona School for the Arts and served on the governing board of the Roosevelt Elementary School District. In 2018, Quiñonez co-authored Dear Senator, a play starring and co-written by former Arizona Attorney General Grant Woods. He also wrote and starred as Che Guevara in El Che. In December 2021, Quiñonez was appointed to the Arizona House of Representatives by the Maricopa County Board of Supervisors, succeeding Diego Rodriguez.

References 

American politicians of Mexican descent
Living people
People from Durango
Graham County, Arizona
People from Phoenix, Arizona
Politicians from Phoenix, Arizona
Mexican emigrants to the United States
Hispanic and Latino American state legislators in Arizona
Arizona State University alumni
Democratic Party members of the Arizona House of Representatives
Year of birth missing (living people)